Gelosia may refer to:

Gelosia (1915 film), directed by Augusto Genina
Jealousy (1942 film), directed by Ferdinando Maria Poggioli 
Jealousy (1953 Italian film), directed by  Pietro Germi
Gelosia multiplication, or Lattice multiplication
Gelosia (Aria), from opera "Ottone in villa" by Antonio Vivaldi